System Alliance Europe is a cooperative of medium-sized freight forwarders. Since its foundation in 2005, the cooperative has expanded. At the moment, the network consists of 61 partners, with 196 branches across 32 European countries. In 2015, the network transported 3.9 million consignments. The network partners employed 76,779 people that year.

Logistics companies of Germany
Companies based in Lower Saxony